{{DISPLAYTITLE:C18H18O2}}
The molecular formula C18H18O2 (molar mass 266.33 g/mol, exact mass 266.13068) may refer to:

 Dienestrol, a synthetic estrogen
 2,8-Dihydroxyhexahydrochrysene, a synthetic estrogen
 Equilenin, a horse steroid
 Honokiol, a lignan
 Juncusol, a 9,10-dihydrophrenathrene found in Juncus species
 Magnolol, a lignan